Parangipettai, historically called Porto Novo ("New Port" in Portuguese), is a panchayat town in Cuddalore district in the Indian state of Tamil Nadu. Parangipettai is located on the north bank of the mouth of the Vellar River at a distance of 30 km from Cuddalore. From the state capital city of Chennai, Parangipettai can be reached through the National Highway NH45A stretch between Cuddalore and Chidambaram.

Its strategic location on the Coromandel Coast has long made Parangipettai a major trading centre. In particular, it was an important trading destination for the Arabs, especially the Yemenis. During the colonial era, the Portuguese, the Dutch and the English successively colonized the area.

There is also a Gandhian connection to Parangipettai. Anne Marie Petersen became in 1909 a missionary in the so-called Loventhal Mission. The foundation stone was laid by Mahatma Gandhi himself in 1921, and a few years later, the school was officially opened under the name Seva Mandir at a place called Porto Novo, near Chidambaram, in Tamil Nadu, South India.

Today, Parangipettai has evolved into a well-developed town with nearly all necessities such as healthcare, education and transport. It also hosts a marine biology station that is affiliated with the Annamalai University.

Parangipettai is an important pilgrimage centre for both Muslims and Hindu.

Etymology

Throughout history, Parangipettai has taken many different names. Parangipettai is mentioned in classical Tamil literature as Varunapuri, meaning the place that the rain god Varuna had worshipped Lord Shiva. Porto Novo is still known for its frequent rainfall. During Nayyakar rule, it was renamed to Muthukrishna Puri and then Mahmood Banthar during Mughal rule. The Portuguese, during their rule, named the place "Porto Novo", which means "New Port" in Portuguese, because they set up a port here and made it their trading stronghold. 

The town is now known as Parangipettai. In Tamil, the word  refers to Europeans, and  means place.

History 
Muslims prominently sunni islam  living in Parangipettai claimed to have a unique African Arabian ancestry. Tamil is their mother tongue but it has been heavily influenced by Persian and Arabic. Previously, especially during the Tamil Chola rule of Tamil Nadu, Arab traders used to heavily trade around the Coromandel coast in which Parangipettai is located. Some traders claimed, throughout time decided to settle down here. 

In 1733, the Swedish East India Company established a factory in Porto Novo though after a month it was destroyed by the British and the French. 

In 1801, Sir George Leith, who was then Lieutenant Governor of Penang, Malaysia, appointed a prominent Indian Muslim Boatman, Cauder Mohudeen, a Christian reconvert, as Captain of the South Indian "Keling" sect.  He granted a piece of land to build a mosque on the south side of Malabar Street (Chulia Street) in Penang, Malaysia. The mosque is now known as Yusof Kapittan Mosque but need more evidence for the claims as per verdict issued by Malaysian Courts. Cauder Mohudeen (born c. 1759) is said to be a small boat mandoor or foreman from Parangipettai in local chats.

The Battle of Porto Novo was fought here in 1781  during the Second Anglo-Mysore War. The conflict pitted the forces of the Kingdom of Mysore under Karim Khan Sahib, accompanied by his father Hyder Ali, against forces belonging to the British East India Company under Sir Eyre Coote. Though they were outnumbered 5 to 1, the British prevailed.

The town flourished as a sea port with connections to southeast Asia and as an industrial centre during British rule, when iron made here was exported to England. The powerful Nawab of Arcot had his mint at Porto Novo and the gold coins struck in this mint came to be called the Porto Novo Pagoda. Later the English followed the same design when they minted the 'Negapatam' (Nagapatnam) Pagoda; the Dutch minted their coin in the same design at Tuticorin and Colombo mints.

Climate

Religion

In Parangipettai, various faiths live together in relative peace. Muslims and Hindus reside in the town in near equal numbers. Christians also live here. Among the Muslims are clans or family groups, but they necessarily affect social interactions like marriages and mutual living. Some of the Muslim are the Maraicars, Sahibs, Ravuthtars and Pattans. The most common ones are Maraicar.  Maraicar the name faded claims to have derived from the old Tamil term 'Marakkalangalin aayargal' meaning 'Kings of Boats', a title said to be given by the Southern Tamil Hindu King Vijaya Raghunadha Sedhupathy Thondamaan (King Sethu) to the Arab traders from parts of Shia Yemen and Sunni Arabia, now Saudi Arabia, whoandwere the reigning members of coastal trade with those regions.

Demographics
At the 2001 India census, Parangipettai had a population of 20,901, with males constituting 49% of the population and females 51%. Parangipettai has an average literacy rate of 75%, higher than the national average of 59.5%: male literacy is 81%, and female literacy is 69%. In Parangipettai, 12% of the population is under 6 years of age.

Economy
Historically, Parangipettai was a trading port, and it now contributes around 3.5% of the state's total fish catch, which is distributed to various districts and other states in the country. Seafood is also exported to other countries overseas. Among the major sea foods merchants from the place are SeaFoods Ltd., with a  well-connected marketing network around the world.

References

External links

 Encyclopedia of Parangipettai
 Parangipettai.tripod.com
 Latest Updates on Porto Novo
 Parangipettai Memes
 Novians Google Group

Cities and towns in Cuddalore district